The Amsden Building collapse occurred on July 23, 1906, in Framingham, Massachusetts. 12 people were killed when the building, which was under construction, suddenly collapsed. A thirteenth person later died from injuries suffered in the accident. The building's contractor and architect were indicted for manslaughter, but the charges were later dropped by the district attorney.

Collapse 
On July 23, 1906, masons, plumbers, and Italian immigrant laborers were working in the George M. Amsden Building, a three-story concrete-and-steel office building which was under construction on Concord St. in South Framingham. Contractor Andrew Jensen was rushing to finish the job, which was supposed to have been completed on July 1. At 3:40 pm, the steel girders on the north side of the building caved in from the side walls and all three floors collapsed into the center of the ground floor. There were about 50 men in the building at the time it fell.

At the time of the collapse, Framingham did not have a building inspector or building department and did not require permits to construct a building. The town had one plumbing inspector, a hardware merchant who was killed in the collapse. Because the Amsden Building was not a factory, was not intended to have more than 10 people employed above the second floor, and was not going to serve as a tenement house or lodging for more than then people, it didn't require supervision from a state building inspector either.

Rescue efforts
The Framingham Fire Department and the 9th regiment of the Massachusetts Volunteer Militia were summoned to the scene, but could not begin rescue efforts until the building's broken pillars were shored up. By the following day, 11 bodies had been found in the rubble and efforts shifted from rescuing survivors to recovering bodies. The body of a twelfth victim was found on July 25. The search ended on July 26 when authorities were satisfied that all of the men in the building at the time of the collapse had been accounted for. Chester Nicholson, a 21-year old carpenter who initially survived the accident was paralyzed and remained hospitalized until his death two years later.

Investigation
George A. Winsor, a civil engineer and concrete expert with 12 years experience in testing cement and concrete, was chosen by the town to investigate the collapse. He found the probable cause of the collapse to be concrete footing used for the basement piers. According to Winsor, the bottom five or six inches of the piers were in such bad shape that it could be broken apart by thumb in some places. He also concluded that attempts were made to repair cracks in one of the walls showed those responsible for the building knew things weren't proper.

An inquest was held before Judge Willis A. Kingsbury of the First Southern Middlesex District Court. His report found that the cause of the accident was "the inadequacy of the pier-footings, aggravated by the overloading of the roof and first floor, and by the steel-frame construction, too light in many positions to bear even the dead weight of the building". He blamed the architect for poor supervision of the project and for accepting the steel work even though it was not up to his specifications, the contractor from overloading the building with construction material and for constructing shoddy pier-footings, and the subcontractor responsible for the steel work for erecting an unsafe frame. "the passage of a law requiring architects to pass examinations as to their qualifications" before being allowed to practice. The report was forwarded to a grand jury on March 8, 1907.

A grand jury indicted contractor Andrew Jensen and architect Charles E. Barnes for manslaughter, however on October 2, 1907, district attorney Hugh Bancroft nol prosed the cases.

References

1906 in Massachusetts
1906 disasters in the United States
Building collapses in Massachusetts
Construction accidents in the United States
Framingham, Massachusetts
July 1906 events